Sterling is a town in Comanche County, Oklahoma, United States. The population was 793 at the 2010 census. It is part of the Lawton Metropolitan Statistical Area.

Geography
Sterling is located at  (34.749450, -98.169470).

Demographics

As of the census of 2010, there were 793 people, 308 households, and 216 families residing in the town. There were 341 housing units at an average density of 426 per square mile (164/km2). The racial makeup of the town was 90.2% White, 11.6% Native American, 0.3% Black or African American, 0.0% Pacific Islander, 0.6% from other races, and 4.7% from two or more races. Hispanic or Latino of any race were 4.7% of the population.

There were 308 households, out of which 34.4% had children under the age of 18 living with them, 53.2% were married couples living together, 13.0% had a female householder with no husband present, and 29.9% were non-families. 25.3% of all households were made up of individuals, and 11.4% had someone living alone who was 65 years of age or older. The average household size was 2.57 and the average family size was 3.11.

In the town, the population was spread out, with 29.5% under the age of 18, 8.6% from 18 to 24, 26.1% from 25 to 44, 20.6% from 45 to 64, and 15.2% who were 65 years of age or older. The median age was 31.2 years. For every 100 females, there were 93.9 males. For every 100 females age 18 and over, there were 87.0 males.

According to the 2000 census, the median income for a household in the town was $26,583, and the median income for a family was $29,563. Males had a median income of $27,841 versus $24,167 for females. The per capita income for the town was $12,707. About 17.7% of families and 20.5% of the population were below the poverty line, including 32.3% of those under age 18 and 13.5% of those age 65 or over.

Utilities 
 Sterling's public works authority provides water, sewer, and sanitation services to the town.
 Electric service is provided by American Electric Power Public Service Company of Oklahoma.
 Natural gas service is provided by Oklahoma Natural Gas.
 Telephone, Internet, and Digital TV Services is provided by Hilliary Communications.
 Digital telephone service and high-speed Internet is provided by Wichita Online and Windstream Communications.

References

Towns in Comanche County, Oklahoma
Towns in Oklahoma